Hébé was a 38-gun of the French Navy, lead ship of the . The British Royal Navy captured her in 1782 and took her into service as HMS Hebe. She was renamed HMS Blonde in 1805.

French Navy career 
Soon after her commissioning under Captain de Vigny, Hébé was tasked to escort a convoy from Saint Malo to Brest and protect shipping from the depredations of the British Royal Navy in the context of the Anglo-French War.

In the action of 4 September 1782, she was chased by the frigate HMS Rainbow, whose 32-pounder carronade chase guns shot away her wheel and mortally wounded her second captain, Yves-Gabriel Calloët de Lanidy. The weight of the ball made de Vigny mistake Rainbow for a disguised ship of the line. Even though the first shots had shown that Rainbows guns had a shorter range than Hébés stern chasers, de Vigny never altered his course to take advantage of the longer range of his guns by firing back a full broadside. Later in the morning, the foremast of Hébé was seriously damaged and another man killed. An hour and a half later, when Rainbow was about to come alongside, de Vigny could only fire his four of five most rear port guns and immediately struck his colours.

British Royal Navy career
The Royal Navy took Hébé into service first as HMS Hebe.

In December 1784 Hebe captured Rover, a smuggling lugger, off the Isle of Wight. Rover had a cargo of 2000 casks of spirits and a quantity of tea. She had come from Flushing and Hebe took her into Portsmouth.

On 3 July 1795 Melampus and  intercepted a convoy of 13 vessels off St Malo. Melampus captured an armed brig and Hebe captured six merchant vessels: Maria Louisa, Abeille. Bon Foi, Patrouille, Eleonore, and Pecheur. The brig of war was armed with four 24-pounders and had a crew of 60 men. Later she was identified as the 4-gun Vésuve. The convoy had been on its way from Île-de-Bréhat to Brest. ,  and the cutter  shared in the prize and head money.

Because Hebe served in the navy's Egyptian campaign (8 March to 2 September 1801), her officers and crew qualified for the clasp "Egypt" to the  Naval General Service Medal, which the Admiralty issued in 1847 to all surviving claimants from the campaign.

On 24 December 1805, the Navy renamed Hebe HMS Blonde.

On 15 August 1807, Blonde, Captain Volant Vashon Ballard, captured Dame Villaret after a chase of 13 hours. She was armed with an 18-pounder gun and four 9-pounder carronades, and had a crew of 69 men. She had been out twenty days but had taken no prizes.

Fate
The Royal Navy paid off Blonde in July 1810. She was eventually broken up at Deptford in June 1811.

Notes, citations, and referencesNotesCitationsReferences'

Age of Sail frigates of France
Hébé-class frigates
1782 ships
Ships built in France
Maritime incidents in 1782
Captured ships
Frigates of the Royal Navy